Shahu Bhonsle II  (1763 – 3 May 1808 CE) was the 7th Chhatrapati  of the Maratha Confedrecy. A member of the Bhonsle clan, he was succeeded by his son Pratap Singh, Raja of Satara Shahu was nominal ruler in Maratha Empire. During his reign, the Marathas won the First Anglo-Maratha War, but lost the Second Anglo-Maratha War. Mahadaji Shinde and the Peshwa were his closest counterparts. He died on 3 May 1808.

References 

Maharajas of Satara
1763 births
1808 deaths